Kondikulam is a village in the Pattukkottai taluk of Thanjavur district, Tamil Nadu, India.

Demographics 

Er.selvakumar. marine engg.and youth congress leader Kondikulam

References 

 

Villages in Thanjavur district